KFST (860 AM) is a radio station broadcasting a soft adult contemporary format. Licensed to Fort Stockton, Texas, United States, the station serves the Fort Stockton-Alpine area. The station is currently owned by Fort Stockton Radio Co and features programming from ABC Radio. KFST airs sports from the Fort Stockton High School Panthers, Texas Longhorns football and basketball broadcasts, and Dallas Cowboys games.

References

External links

FST
Soft adult contemporary radio stations in the United States
Radio stations established in 1989